Vietnam participated at the 2006 Asian Games, held in Doha, Qatar from December 1 to December 15, 2006. Vietnam ranked 19th with 3 gold medals in this edition of the Asiad.

Medalists

References

Nations at the 2006 Asian Games
2006
Asian Games